Yernagate is a legendary giant from English folklore, supposedly a guardian of the New Forest area of Hampshire. He is known for having thrown the man in the Moon into the Moon, and he sleeps today in a hill which bears his name: Yernagate's Nap.

Origins
The story of Yernagate is an example of one of "the fable[s] of ... gyants in the woods" near Southampton, mentioned by Daniel Defoe in 1724. Though the etymology of Yernagate is unknown, the traditional link between the New Forest and giants may be connected with the Anglo-Saxon names for the area: "Ytene" and "Jettenwald" (as well as the later anglicisation of "Ettinwood"), which are interpreted by some as meaning "the wood of giants" or the "giant's weald".

Tradition
Local folklore depicts him as having thrown the man in the Moon into the Moon for collecting too much wood from the New Forest, alongside performing various other tasks and chores. When he grew very old he decided to retire, and so went to sleep in the hill known as Yernagate's Nap. In order to keep watch over the forest, however, he removed his eyes and planted them in a pair of barrows, both today called Little Eye, and he will return from his slumber should the New Forest need him.

Topography
Though recent Ordnance Survey maps depict the site of Yernagate's Nap as being a small deciduous wood to the south of Little Linford Inclosure, according the maps of the 18th and 19th centuries it is actually a circular Bronze Age earthwork, and located on a small hill within Little Linford.

References

English giants
English mythology
New Forest folklore
Hampshire folklore